The Municipal Chamber of Araripina is the legislative body of the government of Araripina in the state of Pernambuco in Brazil.

It is unicameral and is composed of 15 councilors.

Elections timeline
The first election was in 1947. It was followed by an election every four years through 1963. There was a five-year gap before the next election in 1968. Elections followed every four years through 1976. There was a six-year gap before the next election in 1982 and another before the election in 1988. Since 1988, elections have occurred every four years.

2021-2024 legislature
These councilors were elected in 2020 for the legislature of 2021 to 2024.

References

Unicameral legislatures
Municipal chambers in Brazil